Bahia is an album by jazz musician John Coltrane, released in 1965 on Prestige Records, catalogue 7353. It was recorded at two  sessions at the studio of Rudy Van Gelder in Hackensack, New Jersey in 1958. Prestige drew on a stockpile of Coltrane material for several years after his contract had ended without the saxophonist's input.

Track listing
 "Bahia" (Ary Barroso) – 6:17
 "Goldsboro Express" (Coltrane) – 4:45
 "My Ideal" (Richard Whiting and Newell Chase (m) - Leo Robin (w)) – 7:35
 "I'm a Dreamer, Aren't We All" (Ray Henderson (m) - Buddy De Sylva and Lew Brown (w)) – 7:02
 "Something I Dreamed Last Night" (Sammy Fain (m) - Jack Yellen and Herb Magidson (w)) – 10:48

Personnel
 John Coltrane –  tenor saxophone
 Wilbur Harden – flugelhorn, trumpet (tracks 3, 4)
 Freddie Hubbard – trumpet (track 5)
 Red Garland – piano (tracks 1, 3-5)
 Paul Chambers – bass
 Art Taylor – drums (track 1-2,5)
 Jimmy Cobb – drums (tracks 3-4)

References

1965 albums
John Coltrane albums
Prestige Records albums
Hard bop albums
Albums produced by Bob Weinstock